The Men's J. P. Morgan Tournament of Champions 2018 is the men's edition of the 2018 Tournament of Champions, which is a PSA World Series event (Prize money : 165 000 $). The event took place at the Grand Central Terminal in New York City in the United States from 18 January to 25 January. Simon Rösner won his first Tournament of Champions trophy, beating Tarek Momen in the final.

Prize money and ranking points
For 2018, the prize purse was $165,000. The prize money and points breakdown is as follows:

Seeds

Draw and results

See also
2017–18 PSA World Series
2018 PSA World Tour
Women's Tournament of Champions 2018
Tournament of Champions (squash)

References

External links
PSA Tournament of Champions 2018 website
Tournament of Champions 2018 official website

Tournament of Champions
Tournament of Champions
Tournament of Champions
Tournament of Champions 2018
Tournament of Champions